Nisa River may refer to:
 Kladská Nisa, the Czech name for Nysa Kłodzka (Eastern Neisse) a river in Poland
 Lužická Nisa, the Czech name for Lusation Neisse, a river arising in the Czech Republic, and then flowing in Germany and Poland
 , (White Nisa) a right tributary of the Lužická Nisa, entirely in the Czech Republic
 , (Black Nisa) a right tributary of the Lužická Nisa, entirely in the Czech Republic
 Nisa River, Portugal, a river whose source is in the Serra de São Mamede